Monsignor Mieczyslaw Malinski (31 October 1923 – 15 January 2017) was a Polish Catholic priest, theologian and writer.

Biography
He was born in Krakow, Poland, and studied for the priesthood alongside the future Pope John Paul II, whose close friend he is said to have been.  Malinski studied theology at the Jagellonian University and he was ordained on 24 July 1949.  He also completed further studies in Rome, Munich and Münster, producing a successful doctoral thesis on the concept of transcendence in the philosophy of Gabriel Marcel.

Malinski was chaplain to the University of Krakow.  He has also written extensively, authoring well in excess of one hundred published works, several of which are devoted to John Paul II.  He also maintained his own website.  His published works notably include Our Daily Bread, a collection of short spiritual texts and a biography of Pope John Paul II, Pope John Paul II: The Life of My Friend.

In May 2009, Malinski was accused of having informed upon Pope John Paul II to the Polish authorities during the communist regime. Malinski, however, denied the accusations.

See also

References

1923 births
2017 deaths
Polish Roman Catholic priests
Jagiellonian University alumni
Ludwig Maximilian University of Munich alumni